Coffee berry may refer to:

 Coffee cherry, the fruit of coffee plants
 Frangula californica, or California coffeeberry, a plant in the buckthorn family, native to western North America
 Frangula rubra, or Sierra coffeeberry, another plant in the buckthorn family, native to the mountains of California
 Simmondsia chinensis, also known as coffeeberry or jojoba, native to the deserts of western North America